Baumholder is a Verbandsgemeinde ("collective municipality") in the district of Birkenfeld, in Rhineland-Palatinate, Germany. The seat of the Verbandsgemeinde is in Baumholder.

The Verbandsgemeinde Baumholder consists of the following Ortsgemeinden ("local municipalities"):

 Baumholder
 Berglangenbach 
 Berschweiler bei Baumholder 
 Eckersweiler 
 Fohren-Linden 
 Frauenberg 
 Hahnweiler 
 Heimbach 
 Leitzweiler 
 Mettweiler 
 Reichenbach 
 Rohrbach 
 Rückweiler 
 Ruschberg

Verbandsgemeinde in Rhineland-Palatinate